A sandek or sandak ( "companion of child") is a person honored at a Jewish brit milah (circumcision) ceremony, traditionally either by holding the baby boy on the knees or thighs while the mohel performs the brit milah, or by handing the baby to the mohel.

In Modern Hebrew, sandak is also the word for godfather; the film The Godfather is known in Hebrew as HaSandak.

Etymology
The origin of the term has been attributed to a derivation from the Greek sunteknos (syn-, meaning "plus", and tekno, meaning "child"), which means "companion of child". Alternatively, it may be derived from Greek σύνδικος (Latin, "syndicus"), in the sense of "representative," "patron," "advocate."

History
A number of references in midrashim and other early rabbinical works testify to the existence of the sandek in the Talmudic age. In medieval rabbinical literature the references to the office are numerous, and it appears to have been well established and highly esteemed. Thus the "Haggahot Maimuniyyot" mentions that many "covet and eagerly desire to hold the child upon their knees as it is circumcised."

In medieval times the sandek was known by many other names as well, including "ba'al berit" (master of the covenant), "ba'al berit ha-milah" (master of the covenant of circumcision), "tofes ha-yeled" (holder of the child), "av sheni" (second father), and "shaliach" (messenger). The office was surrounded with marks of honor. A special seat, usually richly decorated, was prepared in the synagogue for the sandik, and if the circumcision happened on a day of Torah reading, he was entitled to receive an aliyah. The privilege was reserved for persons of standing and of good moral and religious character. It was restricted also in other ways. Rabbinical authorities (for instance, Rabbenu Peretz and Judah the Hasid) decreed that the privilege should not be given more than once to the same man in the same family, neither should it, unless unavoidable, be given to women. This latter prohibition was based on motives of delicacy. Women were, however, permitted to participate indirectly in the privilege as associates to the sandek. They carried the child to the entrance of the synagogue or to the room in which the circumcision was about to take place, where it was taken by the sandek.

Customs

Rabbi Moses Isserles (the Rema) recorded the practice of the sandek holding the baby on his thighs.

The Rema records a custom that a father should not honor the same individual twice with being the sandek for his children. The reason is that the sandek is compared to a kohen (priest) offering the incense offering in the Jewish Temple. The procedure regarding the incense is that a kohen does not perform this mitzva more than once in his lifetime: as God is presumed to reward with wealth the kohen who offers the incense, as many kohanim as possible are given the opportunity to become wealthy. Similarly, the opportunity is afforded to as many people as possible to serve as a sandek and receive God's blessing to become wealthy.

The Vilna Gaon expresses some skepticism regarding this custom. First, based on its reasoning, the custom should have been that one should not serve more than once as a sandek for any child, not just two different children of one family. Second, the Vilna Gaon writes that no one has become wealthy because he served as a sandek. Nevertheless, the Aruch Hashulchan concludes that the custom recorded by the Rema should be observed. The Aruch Hashulchan notes, though, that the custom in many locales is that the rav (rabbi) of the city serves as the sandek for all the baby boys. The Aruch Hashulchan justifies this practice by comparing the local rav to the kohen gadol (high priest), who had the right to offer a korban (sacrifice) or incense any time he desired. Indeed, it is related that the Chazon Ish served as the sandek for innumerable baby boys. Rabbi Yissocher Frand relates that Rav Yaakov Yitzchak Ruderman (the rosh yeshiva (dean) of Yeshivat Ner Yisrael) also served as the sandek for countless baby boys.

The honor was given traditionally to one Jewish male: some older family member (grandfather, great-grandfather), a rabbi, or another important male who was observant and righteous. The sandek also wore the tallit (prayer shawl) and held the baby on a pillow while the mohel completed the circumcision. In modern times, among some more liberal Jews, the sandek may be female, or even non-Jewish. At most ceremonies, there is only a single sandek, but two are permissible, although more than two is uncommon. 

During the brit, a chair is sometimes placed next to the sandek's seat. The chair is reserved for the prophet Elijah, and remains unoccupied during the ceremony; this practice is derived from the tradition that Elijah protects children from danger. According to some sources, the sandek is the "representative" of Elijah.

References

Birth in Judaism